K-42 or K42 may refer to: 
 K42, a discontinued open-source research operating system
 K-42 (Kansas highway)
 K-42 Camera, a prototype airborne photo reconnaissance camera
 , a corvette of the Indian Navy
 Potassium-42, an isotope of potassium